Theobold is a surname. Notable people with the surname include:

Cara Theobold (born 1990), English actress
Frederick Theobold (1839–1888), English cricketer

See also
Theobald